Kevin Altieri is an American television director of animated cartoons. Altieri's directorial works include episodes of  C.O.P.S., Batman: The Animated Series and Stripperella.

Altieri worked on the music video for Pearl Jam's "Do the Evolution".

Altieri directed the five-minute pilot for Rat Bastard, a cartoon based on the Crucial Comics series of the same name; the short was produced by Imagine Entertainment and pitched to UPN in 2000.

Partial filmography

Television

Film

References

General references

Inline citations

External links

American television producers
Living people
Year of birth missing (living people)
American storyboard artists
American television directors
Place of birth missing (living people)